Hasami jime is a chokehold in judo.  It is described in The Canon of Judo and demonstrated by Kyuzo Mifune in the video The Essence of Judo.

References

External links
Image

 

Judo technique
Grappling hold